The Voyevoda, Op. 3, is an opera in 3 acts and 4 scenes, by Pyotr Ilyich Tchaikovsky with a libretto written by Alexander Ostrovsky and based on his play The Voyevoda (A Dream on the Volga).

The opera was composed between March 1867 and July 1868, and it received its first performance on 11 February [OS January 30] 1869 at the Bolshoi Theatre in Moscow. It was a benefit for Alexandra Menshikova.

In the 1870s Tchaikovsky destroyed the manuscript full score of the opera, while recycling much of the first act in his The Oprichnik (1870–1872). The subject of The Voyevoda was thus left available to his former pupil Anton Arensky to compose as the opera Dream on the Volga in 1888.  Decades later, during the Soviet period, The Voyevoda was posthumously reconstructed from surviving orchestral and vocal parts and the composer's sketches.

Roles

Instrumentation
Strings: Violins I, Violins II, Violas, Cellos, and Double Basses
Woodwinds: Piccolo, 2 Flutes, 2 Oboes, Cor Anglais, 2 Clarinets (B-flat & A), 2 Bassoons
Brass: 4 Horns (all in F), 2 Trumpets (B-flat), 3 Trombones, Tuba
Percussion: Timpani, Triangle, Cymbals, Bass Drum
Other: Harp
Source: Voyevoda (opera) Tchaikovsky Research

Synopsis
Time: The middle of the 17th century
Place: A large city on the Volga River

Overture

Act 1
No.1 Chorus of Maidens & Scena
No.2 Mariya's Ballad & Duet
No.3 Scena
No.4 Bastryukov's Aria
No.5 Scena & Duet
No.6 Scena
No.7 Scena
No.8 Quartet & Scena
No.9 Finale

Act 2
No.10 Introduction
No.11 Chorus of Servants
No.12 Bastryukov's Aria
No.13 Scena & Dubrovin's Aria
No.14 Entr'acte & Dances of the Chambermaids
No.15 Scena & Mariya's Song
No.16 Scena
No.17 Duet
No.18 Scena
No.19 Scena & Khorovod

Act 3
No.20 Entr'acte
No.21 Scena & Dubrovin's Aria
No.22 Scena
No.23 Quartet
No.24 Scena
No.25 Duet
No.26 Scena & Quartet
No.27 Scena
No.28 Quintet 
No.29 Scena & Chorus 
No.30 Scena
No.31 Closing Scena

Source: Tchaikovsky Research

Derived works
The Entr'acte and Dances of the Chambermaids from Act 2 were based on the Characteristic Dances for orchestra (1865), and were also arranged for piano duet by Tchaikovsky. 
Under the pseudonym "Cramer", Tchaikovsky composed a Potpourri on themes from the opera The Voyevoda, for solo piano (1868).

Similarly named works
 In 1886, Tchaikovsky wrote incidental music for the Domovoi scene from Alexander Ostrovsky's A Dream on the Volga.  This is the same play that formed the basis of the opera, but the incidental music is otherwise unconnected to the opera.
Tchaikovsky's symphonic ballad in A minor, entitled The Voyevoda, Op. 78 (1891), is based on Alexander Pushkin's translation of Adam Mickiewicz's poem and thus is not related to the like-named opera in either the music or the underlying story.
Rimsky-Korsakov's opera Pan Voyevoda, set in Poland, likewise is not related to Ostrovsky's play.

Recordings
A complete recording of the opera has been issued on the Aquarius CD label, with Vladimir Kozhukhar conducting soloists with the Academic Grand Chorus of Central Television and All-Union Radio and the State Symphonic Orchestra of the USSR Ministry of culture.
The lively, sometimes dramatic, overture has occasionally been performed and recorded.  It is one of the few works of Tchaikovsky to be performed by Arturo Toscanini and the NBC Symphony Orchestra in a broadcast performance that was preserved on transcription discs.  The overture, as well as the entr'acte and dances, was also included in Vox Records' complete recordings of Tchaikovsky's orchestral music, released on both LP and CD (with Dolby surround sound); János Fürst conducted the Bamberg Symphony.

References

External links
 
Tchaikovsky Research

Operas by Pyotr Ilyich Tchaikovsky
Russian-language operas
1869 operas
Operas
Operas set in Russia
Operas based on plays